Star King is a South Korean television show which first aired on January 13, 2007 on the SBS network.  Star King was the first TV show in Korea to run both online and on television simultaneously. The last episode of "Star King" aired on August 9, 2016.

Format
The show is composed of four segments:
 Only This (딸랑 이거): featuring people with a humorous or unusual skill.
 Train Me! (키워주세요): for contestants seeking to be famous.
 Diet King (다이어트 킹): focusing on people attempting to lose weight. Shawn Lee, a previous winner, lost approximately 40 kg in 60 days.

Viewers upload videos of unusual events and stories to the official website. People and animals with unusual talents are then invited onto the program after being selected from these videos.  The audience votes for their favorite person, video or story, and prize money is awarded to the contestant who receives the most votes.

Episodes typically feature people from a variety of countries, including Brazil, Mongolia and Kenya.  Participants are of all ages.

Critical reception
At one point, Star King held the top spot in audience ratings of any prime time TV show on Saturday.  It suffered a drop in ratings after a "fabrication" scandal.
 
Star King was originally hosted by Kang Ho Dong, a well-known MC, who left the show due to a tax payment controversy.

Episode listing

Winners and guests

 Season 1: Grandpa Rain
 Season 2: 11-year-old BoA (now Seunghee of Oh My Girl)
 Seasons 3 and 4: 40-year-old Dong Bang Shin Ki
 Season 6: 10-year-old Ballad Genius Baek Ye-rin
 Seasons 8 and 9: 5-year-old Mozart
 Season 16: Magic Rainbow dance
 Season 18 and 19: Dangerous boy
 Season 21, 22, and 23: Gugak boy
 Season 24 and 25: Spider man
 Season 26: Fire breathing human
 Season 33: One legged B-boy
 Season 34: Treasure of Mongo
 Season 38: Blind orchestra
 Season 39: B-boy T.I.P.
 Season 52: MoM B-boy
 Season 57: Super Junior Band
 Season 62, 64, and 65: Shadow Show
 Season 68, 69, and 70: 11-year-old drummer
 Season 79, 80, and 81: Two-handed guitar
 Season 84, 85, and 86: Bubble Artist
 Season 93, 95, and 96: OIDO Family Band
 Season 140: Bucheon Bicycle F4
 Season 142: 7-year-old B-boy

References

External links
  Star King Official Homepage
 

2007 South Korean television series debuts
2016 South Korean television series endings
Seoul Broadcasting System original programming
South Korean variety television shows